Crystal is a former unincorporated community in Clark County, Nevada, United States. It lies along the Union Pacific Railroad and had a population of 10 in 1941. It is now the site of a highway rest stop.

Historic maps of Nevada locate Crystal, Clark County to be northeast of Las Vegas along Interstate I-15 at Exit 75, which originally was part of the Nevada State Route 40 highway in that area. It is an enclave within the Moapa River Indian Reservation.

The community was named for the crystal rocks near the original town site.

See also

 List of ghost towns in Nevada

References

Unincorporated communities in Clark County, Nevada
Ghost towns in Nevada